Crocetin is a natural apocarotenoid dicarboxylic acid that is found in the crocus flower together with its glycoside, crocin, and Gardenia jasminoides fruits. It forms brick red crystals with a melting point of 285°C.

The chemical structure of crocetin forms the central core of crocin, the compound responsible for the color of saffron.

Cell studies
Crocin and crocetin may provide neuroprotection in rats by reducing the production of various neurotoxic molecules, based on an in-vitro cell study.

Physiological effects
A 2009 study involving 14 individuals indicated that oral administration of crocetin may decrease the effects of physical fatigue in healthy men.

A 2010 pilot study investigated the effect of crocetin on sleep. The clinical trial comprised a double-blind, placebo-controlled, crossover trial of 21 healthy adult men with a mild sleep complaint. It concluded that crocetin may (p=0.025) contribute to improving the quality of sleep.

In high concentrations, it has protective effects against retinal damage in vitro and in vivo.

Transcrocetinate sodium

The sodium salt of crocetin, transcrocetinate sodium (INN, also known as trans sodium crocetinate or TSC) is an experimental drug that increases the movement of oxygen from red blood cells into hypoxic (oxygen-starved) tissues. Transcrocetinate sodium belongs to a group of substances known as bipolar trans carotenoid salts, which constitute a subclass of oxygen diffusion-enhancing compounds. Transcrocetinate sodium was one of the first such compounds discovered.

Transcrocetinate sodium can be prepared by reacting saffron with sodium hydroxide and extracting the salt of the trans crocetin isomer from the solution. John L. Gainer and colleagues have investigated the effects of transcrocetinate sodium in animal models. They discovered that the drug could reverse the potentially fatal decrease in blood pressure produced by the loss of large volumes of blood in severe hemorrhage, and thereby improve survival.

Early investigations of transcrocetinate sodium suggested that it had potential applications in battlefield medicine, specifically in treatment of the many combat casualties with hemorrhagic shock. Additional studies, carried out in animal models and in clinical trials in humans, indicated that transcrocetinate sodium might prove beneficial in the treatment of a variety of conditions associated with hypoxia and ischemia (a lack of oxygen reaching the tissues, usually due to a disruption in the circulatory system), including cancer, myocardial infarction (heart attack), and stroke.

Transcrocetinate sodium has shown promise of effectiveness in restoring tissue oxygen levels and improving the ability to walk in a clinical trial of patients with peripheral artery disease (PAD) in which reduced delivery of oxygen-rich blood to tissues can cause severe leg pain and impair mobility. The drug has also been under investigation in a clinical trial sponsored by drug developer Diffusion Pharmaceuticals for potential use as a radiosensitizer, increasing the susceptibility of hypoxic cancer cells to radiation therapy, in patients with a form of brain cancer known as glioblastoma. The drug is currently under investigation for its possible use in enhancing the oxygenation status of COVID-19 patients at risk for developing multiple organ failure due to severe respiratory distress.

Mechanism of action
Similar to other oxygen diffusion-enhancing compounds, transcrocetinate sodium appears to improve oxygenation in hypoxic tissues by exerting hydrophobic effects on water molecules in blood plasma and thereby increasing the hydrogen bonding between the water molecules. This in turn causes the overall organization of water molecules in plasma to become more structured, which facilitates the diffusion of oxygen through plasma and promotes the movement of oxygen into tissues.

Trans-crocetin has been found to act as an NMDA receptor antagonist with high affinity, and has been implicated in the psychoactivity of saffron.

See also
 Crocetane

References 

Apocarotenoids
Dicarboxylic acids
NMDA receptor antagonists
Saffron